The Hamilton Cardinals is an amateur Canadian baseball team, in the Intercounty Baseball League based in Hamilton, Ontario. Founded in 1958, the club is the second oldest sports team in the city of Hamilton. Players range in age from 19-35. Many are former major leaguers and minor professionals, as well as current and former NCAA or U Sports players. Home games are played at Bernie Arbour Memorial Stadium.

The team has gone through several name changes over the years, most recently returning to the Cardinals name, after eight seasons as the Thunderbirds. The team became the Hamilton Thunderbirds when Drew Brady purchased the franchise on January 1, 2005, and the club adopted a new look with revitalized facilities and new uniforms. The Hamilton Cardinals played 1,490 games with a record of 525 wins and 965 losses before becoming the Thunderbirds, and winning the Intercounty title in 1978.

But the club announced at a press conference on February 1, 2012, that it would again be named the Hamilton Cardinals, because of the club's relationship with Hamilton Cardinals youth rep program. In late 2013 Gary Molinaro purchased the team and appointed his son JP Molinaro the new team president while also hiring Mike Fortuna as the new general manager.

The team has gone through ownership changes in recent years, first in 2018 when a community ownership group led by Carmen's Group was formed. Then again in 2022, when the ownership structure was changed to include local businessman Eric Spearin as the majority owner with Carmen's Group maintaining a minority position.

On November 16, 2022, the Hamilton Cardinals unveiled a new primary logo and uniforms for the 2023 season. The new logo features a strong modernized Cardinal with a bat over its shoulder featuring a “hammer” inspired bat weight. The logo emphasizes a new black and red colour scheme.

References

External links
 Official website

Sports teams in Hamilton, Ontario
Intercounty Baseball League
Baseball teams in Ontario
Volleyball clubs established in 1958
1958 establishments in Ontario